Artem Miroyevskiy (born 31 May 1999) is a Belarusian professional footballer who plays for Maxline.

References

External links 
 
 

1999 births
Living people
People from Zhlobin District
Sportspeople from Gomel Region
Belarusian footballers
Association football forwards
FC Dinamo Minsk players
FC Chist players
FC Arsenal Dzerzhinsk players
FC Rukh Brest players
FC Dnepr Rogachev players